San Jacinto High School was a secondary school located at 1300 Holman Street in Houston, Texas; now part of the Houston Community College Central College, Central Campus. San Jacinto High School was located in the area now known as Midtown. It was a part of the Houston Independent School District (HISD). It was listed on the National Register of Historic Places (NRHP) on December 4, 2012.

History
The campus, built in 1914, initially housed South End Junior High School; it closed in 1926 when the high school opened. It was established in 1926 after Central High School, which was located near Downtown Houston, was closed.  From 1927 until 1934, the campus was also the first home to Houston Junior College, which eventually became the University of Houston.

Lamar High School opened in 1937, relieving San Jacinto.

In 1962 a technical program was added to the campus. In 1966 HISD purchased a former Hebrew temple, Temple Beth Israel, that it began using as an annex for San Jacinto since its population was increasing. Elaine Clift Gore, the author of Talent Knows No Color: The History of an Arts Magnet High School, wrote that by fall 1969 San Jacinto's vocational program became "the premier HISD vocational high school".

The school was renamed the Houston Technical Institute on June 1, 1971. The neighborhood program ended in 1971, and the technical program was abolished in 1985. High School for the Performing and Visual Arts was housed at San Jacinto from 1971 to 1981. Houston Community College System purchased the school grounds. The San Jacinto Memorial Museum is on the school grounds.

In 2014, Skanska USA Building completed $35 million in work to update and restore the San Jacinto Memorial Building, which was originally built in phases between 1914 and 1936. Hidden, original windows were encountered during the demolition and restored/left in place as a design element. Other new elements were introduced including six 5,000-pound beams that have been installed to enable modern, column-free bathrooms, and an elevator tower, and four stair towers added to the rear of the building.  In the auditorium, seating, plaster, and flooring were redone as well.

Demographics
In 1969, 51.6% of San Jacinto's students were black and 48.4% were White. The figure for White students included non-Hispanic white students and Hispanics together. For several years prior to the 1970 desegregation, HISD had a policy stating that students wanting to take a vocational program could transfer to another school that offered that program whether it was a "white" school or a "black" school if the program was not offered at their zoned school.

In 1937 there were five students of Mexican origin enrolled at San Jacinto.

Notable alumni
 Albert Bel Fay (1930), Houston businessman and Republican party activist
 Marva Black Beck, Texas politician
 Young Bussey, quarterback for the Chicago Bears of the NFL - killed in action during World War II
 Dr. Denton Cooley, heart surgeon 
 Walter Cronkite  (1933), television journalist
 A. J. Foyt, Jr., auto racer (also attended Pershing and Hamilton middle schools and Lamar High School - did not graduate from San Jacinto)
 Rabbi Jimmy Kessler, founder of the Texas Jewish Historical Society
 James E. Lyon, Houston developer and Republican politician
 Glenn McCarthy, oilman and entrepreneur
 Maxine Mesinger, gossip columnist
 Jerry J. Moore, real estate developer
 Diane Ravitch, former US Assistant Secretary of Education, author, historian
 Gale Storm (born Josephine Cottle), actress and singer
 David Westheimer, author
 Kathy Whitmire, former Mayor of Houston

See also

References
 Gore, Elaine Clift. Talent Knows No Color: The History of an Arts Magnet High School (Research in curriculum and instruction) Information Age Publishing, 2007. , 9781593117610.

Notes

External links

Public high schools in Houston
Former high schools in Houston
Defunct schools in the Houston Independent School District
University of Houston
National Register of Historic Places in Houston
School buildings on the National Register of Historic Places in Texas
Houston Independent School District high schools
Midtown, Houston